Warehou may refer to these fish:

 Blue warehou or common warehou, Seriolella brama
 Silver warehou, Seriolella punctata
 White warehou, Seriolella caerulea
 Bluenose warehou, Hyperoglyphe antarctica